This is a list of historic and current command flags of the Royal Navy.

Command rank flags to denote the commander-in-chief of the English fleet and later Royal Navy were used from as early as 1189. Coloured squadrons of the Royal Navy were established during the Elizabethan era to subdivide the fleet into three squadrons or more. There were three classes of admirals and later a fourth that were differentiated by using coloured flags red, white and blue.

History

The earliest known usage of a command flag being used to denote the Commander-in-Chief of the English Fleet was during the reign of Richard I in 1189 that depicted a single gold lion on a red background. In 1198 it was changed to include three red lions against a red background which are still part of the royal coat arms of England till today. In January 1340 Edward III proclaimed himself King of France and adopted the arms of France then displaying (multiple fleur-de-lis or azure semi-of-fleur-de-lis) in the upper left and the lower right cantons with the arms of England in the upper right and lower left cantons to create a new Royal Standard. In 1411 Henry IV altered the French element of the standard to include just three fleur-de-lis.

In June 1340 Edward III commanded the English fleet at the Battle of Sluys where the king's standard was flown at top of the main masthead. This positioning of the only command flag used during that battle was later reserved for use by the monarch or his deputy commander the Lord Admiral. In 1495 Henry VII authorized the use of his standard during the expeditions of John Cabot. In 1530 Henry VIII instructed Sir Thomas Audley to create a set of instructions that made clear which command flags were to be flown on board ships and by whom (at this time a single command flag was to be used at the top of the masthead). Audley produced the book of instructions called the Book of Orders for the War by Sea and by Land. Between 1545 and 1547 Lord Lisle under instructions from the King altered Audley's instructions this time to denote three squadron commanders as follows.

The Lord Admiral shall fly the royal standard at the top of the main masthead and the flag of the cross of Saint George at the top of fore (front) masthead displaying two flags every ship in his squadron the captains were to fly a single Saint Georges flag at the top of the main masthead. The Admiral of the Van or (Vice-Admiral) of the front squadron flew two flags of Saint George one at the top of the main masthead center and the other at the top of the front masthead. All captains of ships in his squadron fly a single cross of Saint George at the top of the fore masthead. The Admiral of the Wyng or (Rear-Admiral) of the rear squadron to display two flags of Saint George one at the top of the main masthead center and the other at the top of the mizzenmast or rear mast head. All captains of ships in his squadron fly a single cross of Saint George at the top of the rear masthead.

From 1545, the Council of the Marine debated that it was necessary to identify which ship carried an admiral, and this achieved by flying the St. George Cross flag from the mizzen mast. When English fleets became larger, flags started to become used as signals of a squadron to which a particular ship belonged; this was initially done by flying a flag on either the foremast, or the mizzen mast or the top mast. The royal standards were used to identify which senior naval commander was on board. By 1588, only the royal arms, the national flags, and the squadron ensigns (by this time plain red, blue and white flags, for the first, second and third squadrons respectively) were used.

The Navy Royal inaugurated squadron colours during the reign of Elizabeth I (1558-1603) to subdivide the English fleet into three squadrons. There were three classes of admirals and differentiated by using coloured flags. In 1620 the official flag ranks of admiral, vice admiral, and rear admiral were legally established that arose directly out of the organisation of the fleet into three parts.

Historic command flags

Royal Standard (1189-1627)

Admiralty flag (1588–1964)

The Admiralty anchor flag first appears as a badge in the early 16th century that was mainly used for decorative purposes. The first time a specific flag was designed and flown was for the Lord Admiral of England Sir Lord Howard of Effingham on HMS Ark Royal as Commander-in-Chief of the English Fleet against the Spanish Armada in 1588. It would not be flown again until 1623 when the Lord Admiral the Duke of Buckingham was given an ensign depicting the admiralty anchor. However it was rarely used for as a command flag for naval operations instead it became the main flag to signify the Admiralty and Marine Affairs Office.

Lord Admirals command flags (1545–1558)
Included:

Lord Admirals command flags (1559–1625)
Included:

Vice and Rear Admirals of England command flags (1545–1596)

Included:

Note:The Vice Admiral flies two flags of Saint George flown at the top of the main center mast head the other at the top of the fore mast head.
Note:The Rear Admiral flies two flags of Saint George flown at the top of the main center mast head the other at the top of the mizzen (rear) mast head.

Captains command flag in the Lord Admirals Squadron (1545–1596)
Included:

Note: A captains ship in the Lord Admirals center squadron has the flag of Saint George flown at the top of the main center masthead.
Note: A captains ship in the Van squadron (front) has the flag of Saint George flown at the top of the main fore masthead.
Note: A captains ship in the Wyng squadron (rear) has the flag of Saint George flown at the top of the mizzen masthead.

Illustration of squadrons flagships and captains ships depicting position of command flags (1545-1596)
Included:
Lord Admirals squadron

Vice Admirals squadron

Rear Admirals squadron

Squadron Admirals command flags (1558-1596)
Command flags for other Vice or Rear Admirals that were not either an Admiral, Vice-Admiral or Rear-Admiral of the Fleet (England)

Lord Admirals and General of the Army command flags (1596)
Included:

Lord Admiral

General of the Army's command flag (1596)
Included:

In 1596 the expedition for Capture of Cádiz during the Anglo-Spanish War was led by joint commanders styled as "Generalls of the Armies by land and sea", Robert Devereux, 2nd Earl of Essex in command of land forces and Charles Howard, 1st Earl of Nottingham in command of naval forces, the English fleet consisted of four squadrons. Their immediate subordinates were Thomas Howard, 1st Earl of Suffolk as Vice Admiral of the Fleet and Sir Walter Raleigh as Rear Admiral of the Fleet. They both commanded a squadron and had a vice admiral (second-in-command) and rear admiral (third-in-command) subordinate to them. The command flags issued for that expedition are described as following.

The Lord Admiral fly's the royal standard at the main masthead and the flag of the cross of Saint George at the fore (front). The Vice Admiral and Rear Admiral in the Lord Admirals squadron fly at the front and rear mastheads a red, white and blue seven stripped horizontal flag with the cross of saint George in the upper left canton. The Earl of Essex fly's only a single flag of the cross of saint George at the main, the Vice and Rear admiral in his squadron fly a saint George flag barred with blue stripes horizontal. The Vice Admiral of the Fleet to fly a green and white striped flag with the cross of saint George in the upper left canton main mast head and flag of saint George front mast head. The Vice and Rear admirals in his squadron flew the same flags in their respective positions (proper masthead). The Rear Admiral of the Fleet to fly a green and white striped flag with the cross of saint George in the upper left canton main mast head and flag of saint George rear mast head. The Vice and Rear admirals in his squadron flew plain white flags in their respective positions (main and front) and (main and Rear) mastheads.

Note: Originally discussions that took place before fleet was sent to Cadiz considered four colours to identify each squadron they were a plain flag tawny orange (orange squadron), a plain crimson flag (red) (crimson squadron), a plain blue flag (blue squadron) and a plain white flag (white squadron).

Vice and Rear Admirals command flags in the Lord Admirals squadron (1596)
Included:

Vice and Rear Admirals command flags in the General of the Army's (1596)
Included:

Vice Admiral and Rear Admirals of the Fleet command flags (1596)
Included:

Vice and Rear Admirals command flags in the Rear Admirals of the fleet squadrons (1596)
Included:

Illustration of squadrons flagships depicting position of command flags (1596)
Included:
Lord Admirals squadron

General of the Army's squadron

Vice Admirals of the Fleet squadron

Rear Admirals of the Fleet squadron

Admirals command flags expedition to Cadiz (1625)
Included:

In 1625 there was a second Cádiz expedition in which the English fleet was divided into three coloured squadrons each commanded by an admiral of the red, white and blue. Perrin (1922) does note indicate what flag rank these officers were suffice to say there was no admiral of the red in existence until 1805 so we must assume they were vice-admirals.

Admirals command flags expedition to attack Cadiz October (1625)
Included:

Admiral of the Fleet and Commander-in-Chief's squadron

Vice Admiral of the Fleets squadron

Rear Admiral of the Fleets squadron

Admirals command flags at the Siege of Saint-Martin-de-Ré in (1627)
Included:

Admiral of the Fleet and Commander-in-Chief's squadron

Vice Admiral of the Fleets squadron

Rear Admiral of the Fleets squadron

Additional squadrons in this expedition

Lord Denbigh's squadron

Sir John Pennington's squadron

Of note: A fleet of 100 ships was assembled for the Siege of Saint-Martin-de-Ré, France in 1627, this was the only time an English admiral flew the Scottish saltaire as his command flag.

Standardisation of command flags after (1627 to 1649)
From 1628 following the creation of the Board of Admiralty and the post of Lord Admiral placed in abeyance the Royal Standard was not used thereafter as the command flag at sea for a Commander-in-Chief of the English Navy. The Lord High Admirals office was revived only two more times after this date in 1702 and in 1828 with the office holders functioning in an administrative capacity.

Flag officers small fleets 
Included:

Note: Small fleets that consisted of three squadrons the admirals commanding were instructed to fly the above command flags in their correct positions.

Flag officers large fleets
Included:

Order of precedence 
The squadrons ranked in order red, white, and blue, with admirals ranked according to their squadron with their command flags flown in their respective positions

 Admiral of the Fleet
 Admiral of the white
 Admiral of the blue
 Vice-Admiral of the red (no rank of admiral of the red until 1805)
 Vice admiral of the white
 Vice admiral of the blue
 Rear-admiral of the red
 Rear-Admiral of the White
 Rear-Admiral of the Blue
 Commodore of the red
 Commodore of the white
 Commodore of the blue

Changes in command flags commonwealth of England from (1649 to 1660)
Following the execution of Charles I of England, the royal standard was replaced by the Commonwealth standard, with the cross and harp this was used as the main command flag for the General's at Sea together with a designated squadron ensign.

Included:

Generals at Sea in command of the red squadron

Generals at Sea in command of the white squadron

Generals at Sea in command of the blue squadron

Vice Admiral of the Fleets squadron

Vice Admiral of the Grand squadron

Rear Admiral of the Fleet (Blue) acting as Vice Admiral of the Grand squadron

Note: During this period the rest of the commonwealth fleet was divided into nine formations each assigned red, white and blue colours that included plain flags and the coloured ensigns. At the Restoration

Previous command flags re-established (1660 to 1702)
In 1660 the all previous command flags used during the commonwealth period were changed back to what they were from 1627 to 1649. However during this period we see the introduction of the post of Commodore being initially recognized (though not formally) in November 1674. The Board of Admiralty on the advice of the Navy Board approved the use of the first pendant (later known as a pennant) to denote the command flag of senior officer in charge of a small squadron under a captain as a plain red pendant. The use of the flag became known as The Distinction Pendant to denote a Commander-in-Chief who did not hold flag rank. In January 1684 a proposal was put forward to distinguish two senior officers in a small squadron based on their age difference and relevant naval experience it recommended the issuing of two pendants a plain red of distinction with a white cross for the officer of distinction and a smaller plain red for the officer of the ordinary this separating of two types of commodores would evolve into those of the first class and second class. In 1734 the title of commodore was formally approved by an Order in Council. In 1806
the temporary flag rank of Commodore was to be distinguished by a 'Broad Plain Pennant' of either red, white or blue. The ordinary commodore commanding a ship themselves would have the same coloured pennants but with a single large white ball near the staff. Below for illustrative purpose is what they might have looked like.

Note: Perrin (1922) in his descriptions of admirals command flags does not mention the commodore ordinary of the white squadrons pendant in relation to the 1805 changes thus we must assume that as the Red and Blue squadrons officers were changed to large white balls; the white squadron had to have a large red ball.

Changes in command flags in February (1702)
Included:
In February 1702 the Senior Naval Lord Sir George Rooke sent instructions to the Navy Board requesting a new structure for command flags to be flown.
 
Lord High Admiral

Vice and Rear Admirals in red squadron

Admiral of the White

Vice and Rear Admirals in white squadron

Admiral of the Blue

Changes in command flags from March (1702 to 1864)
On 24 March 1702 the First Lord of the Admiralty instructed the Senior Naval Lord Admiral Sir George Rooke and Board of Admiralty to have designed new command flags for flag officers. These would remain in place with some minor changes until 1805 when the rank of Admiral of the Red is introduced and included the following:

Admiral of the Fleet
Flag of the union flown at main topgallant masthead as his proper flag. The Union flag was used as a maritime flag in 1606 during the reign of James VI and I (of Scotland 1567-1625, of England and Ireland 1603-1625), the Union of the Crowns taking place in 1603.

Admirals
Flags flown at main topgallant masthead as his proper flag.

Vice Admirals
Flags flown at the fore topgallant masthead as his proper flag.

Rear Admirals
Flags flown at the mizzen topgallant masthead as his proper flag.

Commodores 
 Broad pennants flown at the mizzen topgallant masthead as his proper flag.
Included:

 Order of precedence from 1805
The squadrons ranked in order red, white, and blue, with admirals ranked according to their squadron with their command flags flown in their respective positions:
 Admiral of the Fleet
 Admiral of the red
 Admiral of the white
 Admiral of the blue
 Vice admiral of the red 
 Vice admiral of the white
 Vice-Admiral of the blue
 Rear-admiral of the red
 Rear-Admiral of the White
 Rear-Admiral of the Blue
 Commodore of the red
 Commodore of the white
 Commodore of the blue

Changes in command flags and standardized from (1864-current)

Admirals of the Fleet

Admirals

Vice Admirals

Rear Admirals

Commodores 
Included:

Current standards and definitions for flying command flags (2015)
The following official instructions issued by the Ministry of Defence, 1 April 2015.

 The Royal Standard
 The Royal Standard, being the personal flag of the Sovereign, is to be hoisted on board HM ships and on official buildings and enclosures only when the Sovereign is present.
 
 Lord High Admiral
 The Flag of the Lord High Admiral. The flag of the Lord High Admiral is to be hoisted, on occasions when the Lord High Admiral (office currently vacant), is present with any body of Royal Naval or Royal Marines forces, afloat or ashore, and on such other maritime occasions as The Lord High Admiral may command.
 
Flag Officers
 Admirals: Flags. Admirals of the Fleet, former First Sea Lords and Admirals who are or have been Chief of Defence Staff are to fly the Union Flag at the main when embarked in one of HM Ships or visiting one of HM establishments. The incumbent First Sea Lord is to fly the flag of an Admiral. The flag of an Admiral is to be flown at the main whilst other Flag Officers are to fly their flags at the fore. The flag of an Admiral is to take precedence over the flags of Admirals who are former First Sea Lords and former Admirals who have been Chief of Defence Staff when embarked at the same time unless otherwise directed.

Commodores
 Commodores’ Broad Pennants: Commodores are to fly their broad pennant at the fore. Commodores RNR on the Active List are to fly their broad pennant in the ship or establishment to which they are affiliated.

Standard squadron colours
Coloured squadrons were established as early as the 1580s. In 1864, after approximately 368 years, the designation of coloured squadrons and the promotion path of flag officers under this system were abolished.

Descriptions of flags of admirals of the colour
Included:

 Lord Admiral and Lord High Admiral of England (royal standard, on three occasions the admiralty anchor flag to 1702)
 Admiral of the Fleet (flag of England or union flag or royal standard if instructed to fly it or flag of the commonwealth of England to 1864)
 Admiral of the Red (plain red flag 1805 to 1864)
 Admiral of the White (plain white flag 1625 to 1705)
 Admiral of the White (St George flag 1702 to 1864)
 Admiral of the Blue (plain blue flag 1625 to 1864)
 Vice-Admiral of the Red (plain red flag 1702 to 1805)
 Vice-Admiral of the Red (plain red flag with one white ball in the upper left canton from 1805 to 1864)
 Vice-Admiral of the White (St George cross with one blue ball in the upper left canton from 1702 to 1805)
 Vice-Admiral of the White (St George cross with one red ball in the upper left canton from 1805 to 1864)
 Rear-Admiral of the Blue (plain blue flag with one white ball in the upper left canton from 1702 to 1864)
 Rear-Admiral of the Red (plain red flag with two white balls in the upper left canton from 1702 to 1864)
 Rear-Admiral of the White (St George cross with two blue balls in the upper left canton from 1702 to 1805)
 Rear-Admiral of the White (St George cross with two white balls in the upper left canton from 1805 to 1864)
 Rear-Admiral of the Blue (plain blue flag with two white balls in the upper left canton from 1702 to 1864)
 Commodore of the Red first class (plain red broad pennant from 1826 to 1864)
 Commodore of the White first class (cross of St George on a white broad pennant 1826 to 1864) 
 Commodore of the White second class (cross of St George with a red ball in the upper left canton on a white broad pennant 1864 to 1954) 
 Commodore of the Blue second class all squadrons (plain blue broad pennant from 1826 to 1864)

Note:First and second class commodore ranks were introduced in 1826 the first class commodore commanded captains and ships the second class commodore flew a different broad pennant when on board a ship and in command himself.

Rank flags from 1864

 Admiral of the Fleet (union flag from 1864–present)
 Admiral (cross of st George from 1864–present)
 Vice-Admiral (cross of st George with a larger single red ball upper left canton)
 Rear-Admiral (of cross of st George with two larger red balls upper left canton)
 Commodore (cross of st George on a white broad pennant 1954–present) 
 Commodore first class (cross of St George on a white broad pennant 1864–1954) 
 Commodore second class (cross of St George with a red ball in the upper left canton on a white broad pennant 1864 to 1954)

See also
 Maritime flag
 Glossary of flag terms
 William Gordon Perrin

Notes

References

Citations

Sources 

 Admiralty, Great Britain (1757). "III". Regulations and Instructions Relating to His Majesty's Service at Sea (IX ed.). London, England. .
 Admiralty, Great Britain (1862). "XI: Distinguishing Flags". The Queen's Regulations for the Royal Navy: Revised ... London, England: H.M.Stationery office. 
 Childs, David (2014). "Captain and Commanders". The Warship Mary Rose: The Life and Times of King Henry VII's Flagship. Barnsley, England: Seaforth Publishing. .
 Defence, Ministry of (2015) "Queens Regulations for the Royal Navy: Chapter 91" (PDF). royalnavy.mod.uk. London, England: Ministry of Defence, United Kingdom.
 Grieve, Martin; Raeside, Rob; Southworthy, Christopher (2003). "United Kingdom: Royal Navy rank flags". International Federation of Vexillological Associations.
 Oppenheim, Michael (1896). "Elizabeth (1558-1603)". A history of the administration of the royal navy and of merchant shipping in relation to the navy, from MDIX to MDCLX, with an introduction treating of the preceding period. London, England and New York, USA: London, New York, J. Lane. 
 Perrin, W. G. (William Gordon) (1922). "Flags of Command: Admirals Flags". British flags, their early history, and their development at sea; with an account of the origin of the flag as a national device. Cambridge, England: Cambridge University Press.
 Squadron Colours" (2014), (PDF). National Museum of the Royal Navy.

 Attribution
 This article contains a supporting note compiled from copied content in relation to this article Union Jack.

Royal Navy lists
Royal Navy command